Ringbolt hitching is a series of hitches made around a ring. Covering a ring in hitching can prevent damage if the ring is likely to chafe or strike against something, such as a mooring line or mast.

Continuous
Continuous ring hitching, also known as single ringbolt hitching, is a series of identical hitches made around a ring. This is considered the simplest form of ringbolt hitching.

Alternate
Alternate ring hitching, also known as kackling or keckling, is a type of ringbolt hitching formed with a series of alternate left and right hitches made around a ring.

As a means of dampening sound in row boats when a covert night operation was being undertaken, oar handles were wrapped in keckling knots to prevent wood rubbing on wood.

See also
Chirality (mathematics)
List of knots
List of hitch knots

References